Nedra Johnson (born July 27, 1966) is an American rhythm and blues and jazz singer/songwriter and multi-instrumentalist. She has performed internationally at jazz, blues, pride and women's music festivals as a solo artist, a tuba player, and vocalist.

Early life
Johnson was born in New York City in 1966. She is the daughter of jazz performer Howard Johnson.

Career
Johnson has performed in internationally in cities including Paris, Nîmes, Berlin, Vienna, Kassel, Munich, Leverkusen, Los Angeles, New York, New Orleans, Los Angeles, Seattle, Portland, San Francisco, Oakland, Cleveland, Madison, Chicago, and New Caledonia. She has also performed with her father Howard Johnson and his group, Gravity.

For many years, she performed as a professional bassist and continues with solo acoustic performances with an R&B flair.

Johnson, a lesbian, is a performer of women's music. On her first album, Testify, she recorded the black lesbian feminist poet Pat Parker's 1978 poem "Where Will You Be?" In 2005, Johnson released her own version of "Amazon Women Rise" as a tribute to the lesbian songwriter Maxine Feldman, a founding figure in women's music.

Awards
Her self-titled release received a 2006 OUTMUSIC Award for Outstanding New Recording-Female.

Discography

Albums

Studio albums
Testify (1998)
Nedra (2005)

Notable performances
Michigan Womyn's Music Festival, Wahalla, MI: 2014, 2005, 2003, 2001, 1999, 1998, 1996, 1992
Queer Is Folk Festival, Chicago, IL: 2005
National Queer Arts Festival, San Francisco, CA: 2003, 2002
Femme Funk Festival, Nouméa, New Caledonia: 2002, 1999
National Women's Music Festival, Muncie, IN: 1998, 1996

References

External links
Official website

1966 births
African-American women singer-songwriters
20th-century African-American women singers
American double-bassists
American rhythm and blues musicians
American tubists
Women tubists
Feminist musicians
Lesbian feminists
American lesbian musicians
LGBT African Americans
American LGBT singers
Living people
Musicians from New York City
Singer-songwriters from New York (state)
American women bloggers
American bloggers
Women's music
21st-century American women singers
21st-century American double-bassists
21st-century tubists
21st-century American singers
20th-century American women singers
20th-century American double-bassists
20th-century tubists
20th-century American singers
20th-century LGBT people
21st-century LGBT people
21st-century African-American women writers
21st-century American women writers
21st-century African-American writers